Kamyaran (also Romanized as Kāmyārān) is a city in Kamyaran County, Kurdistan Province, Iran, of which it is the county seat. As of the 2016 census, the city had a population of 57,077 in 16,547 families.

Demographics 
The city is populated by Kurds.

References

Towns and villages in Kamyaran County
Cities in Kurdistan Province
Kurdish settlements in Kurdistan Province